RAFO Thumrait airbase  is a military airport located near Thumrait, a town in Dhofar Governorate, Oman.  The Royal Air Force of Oman (RAFO) are the operators of RAFO Thumrait, and is home to two RAFO squadrons of F16s.  The United States Air Force (USAF) is a current tenant, and the British Royal Air Force (RAF) and the Indian Air Force (IAF) also use RAFO Thumrait during regular cross-nation military exercises.

Facilities

History  
Originally an oil depot, RAFO Thumrait was established to project air power in that region of Oman.  The first Omani air unit based at Thumrait, equipped with ex-RAF Hawker Hunter FGA.9 aircraft, was tasked with ground attack and intercept missions.  Twelve new SEPECAT Jaguar fighter-bombers were added to the base's complement to improve attack capabilities in 1977.

RAFO Thumrait has been used by American, British, and allied air forces to support operations during operations Desert Shield, Desert Storm,  Desert Fox, and Global War on Terror operations in Afghanistan.  Many current such operations now operate from Muscat International Airport, which is closer to the area of operations.

A US Air Force War Reserve Materiel (WRM) contract was let to DynCorp Technical Services to provide support for bare base systems, medical, munitions, fuels mobility support equipment, vehicles, rations, aerospace ground equipment, air base operability equipment, and associated spares and other consumables at Royal Air Force of Oman (RAFO) airbase, Thumrait.  These services include maintaining war reserve materiel (WRM) stored at Thumrait.

Exercises held at RAFO Thumrait
The US Air Force's 16th Special Operations Wing, 823rd 'Red Horse' Squadron went to RAFO Thumrait on 17 April 1996 for 'Eastern Castle', an exercise with the Omani military.  During this exercise, the US Air Force built runway and apron extensions, and installed overhead lighting in the base's aircraft hangars.

Saif Sareea
Exercise Saif Sareea (Swift Sword} are a series of military exercises between Her Majesty's (UK) Armed Forces and His Majesty the Sultan of Oman's Armed Forces.  First held in 1987, Saif Sareea is one of several major training exercises held approximately every four years; to deploy, sustain, exercise and recover a medium-scale war-fighting Joint Task Force at strategic distance into a key strategic area and demonstrate the Joint Rapid Reaction Force (J-RRF) concept.

Saif Sareea 2 (Swift Sword 2) was the second iteration, held in Oman between September and November 2001.  It involved a combination of His Majesty the Sultan of Oman's Armed Forces and Her Majesty's (UK) Armed Forces; with naval, ground and air activities.

On 2 October 2018, the first four of eight Typhoon FGR4 fighter jets II (Army Coperation) Squadron travelled to RAFO Thumrait from their home base of RAF Lossiemouth in Scotland for Saif Sareea 3.  This time, as part of 140 Expeditionary Air Wing (140 EAW), the Typhoons will be supported by an E-3D Sentry AEW1, operated by 8 Squadron, normally based at RAF Waddington in England.  According to the official Royal Air Force website, "The Typhoons will fly alongside the Royal Air Force of Oman's F-16 aircraft during the largest tri-service, bilateral, interoperability exercise in the region for almost two decades".  Other RAF elements at Thumrait in support of SS3 was 1 Squadron RAF Regiment.

Eastern Bridge
In 2009, Indian Air Force pilots of 'Flaming Arrows' and 'Cobras', two SEPECAT Jaguar Squadrons, participated in joint exercises called 'Eastern Bridge', alongside the Royal Air Force of Oman (RAFO)'s force of SEPECAT Jaguars and F-16 Fighting Falcons at RAFO Thumrait.  Another Indo-Omani exercise, 'Eastern Bridge-II', took place in 2011 at Indian Air Force Station Jamnagar (Gujarat).

References

External links

Airports in Oman
Royal Air Force of Oman